The 1937–38 Ranji Trophy was the fourth season of the Ranji Trophy that was contested between 18 cricket teams in four zones in a knockout format. Hyderabad defeated the defending champions Nawanagar in the final.

Highlights
 Hyderabad qualified for the final after getting walkovers in the previous two rounds when their opposition failed to appear. The Ranji final was the only match they played in this season.
 Hyderabad's feat of winning the Ranji trophy while winning only one match is a rare feat: Maharashtra in 1940–41, Bombay in 1967–68, Hyderabad again in 1986–87 and Bengal in 1989–90 all won only one match outright while winning the title. 
 Amar Singh topped the batting and bowling aggregates for the season. He scored 370 runs and took 24 wickets in four matches.
 Against Bombay in the decisive match in the West Zone, Amar Singh scored 140* and took 6/22 in the first innings, bowling Bombay out for 45. Against Baroda he scored 66 and took 6 wickets in the match, and against Sind 86 and 10 wickets for 61 (3/35 and 7/26).  
 Nawanagar defeated Baroda by an innings and 275 runs, Sind by an innings and 144 runs and Bombay by an innings and 130 runs before losing the final.

Zonal Matches

East Zone

North Zone

West Zone

South Zone

Inter-Zonal knockout matches

Final

Scorecards and averages
Cricketarchive

References

External links
 Ranji Trophy, 1937-38 at ESPNcricinfo archive
 

1938 in Indian cricket
Indian domestic cricket competitions